Irwin Ávalos (born June 13, 1991) is a Mexican basketball player for Libertadores de Querétaro and the Mexico national team.

He participated at the 2017 FIBA AmeriCup.

References

External links
 Irwin Ávalos at RealGM

1991 births
Living people
Mexican men's basketball players
Power forwards (basketball)
Club San Martín de Corrientes basketball players
Fuerza Guinda de Nogales players
Fuerza Regia de Monterrey players
Jefes de Fuerza Lagunera players
Libertadores de Querétaro players
Mantarrayas de La Paz players
Santos de San Luis players
Mexican expatriate basketball people in Argentina
Basketball players from Durango
People from Durango City